CompuCom Systems Inc. is a technology managed services provider and product reseller headquartered in Indian Land, South Carolina.  It is a wholly owned subsidiary of Variant Equity Advisors.  In business since 1987, CompuCom provides Managed Workplace Services including IT solutions and hardware, integration and support services and has partnerships within the technology space such as HP, IBM, Cisco, Dell, Apple, Inc, Jamf Pro, AirWatch.

Corporate history 
CompuCom was formed in 1987 by Safeguard Scientifics, a venture capital company. It was started when predecessor Machine Vision International acquired two computer-focused technology companies, Tri-Star Data Systems and Office Automation, under the umbrella of Safeguard Scientifics, which named the merged company CompuCom.

Under the majority ownership of Safeguard Scientifics, CompuCom became a public company in 1987. Also that year, it acquired the CompuShop retail store chain from Bell Atlantic, and moved into its Dallas headquarters. James W. Dixon, president of CompuShop was appointed CEO of CompuCom and served from 1987 to 1996 and became chairman of the board on leaving

Safeguard Scientifics held majority ownership of CompuCom until 2004, building it into a company with $1.5 billion in annual revenues.

In December 2000, CompuCom purchased the assets of MicroAge Technology Services, one of the largest divisions of bankrupt parent company MicroAge. This included all of MicroAge's remaining service network of locations.

In 2004, Safeguard sold CompuCom to Platinum Equity, a private equity investment firm for $128 million, and appointed Dixon as CEO. CompuCom acquired GE Capital Information Technology Solutions (GE ITS), to expand its services portfolio. CompuCom then became partners and resellers of Jamf Pro, VMware.

In 2007, Platinum Equity sold CompuCom to Court Square Capital Partners, a private equity firm.

In 2008, CompuCom acquired the U.S. division of Getronics and in 2009, joined with Getronics and other IT services providers to form the Getronics Workspace Alliance.

In 2013, CompuCom was sold to Thomas H. Lee Partners, also a private equity firm.

In 2015, Dixon retired as CEO, and was replaced by Dan Stone in 2016.

In 2016, the company moved its headquarters from Dallas to Plano, Texas.

In 2017, CompuCom was sold to Office Depot and moved its headquarters to Indian Land, South Carolina.

in 2021, CompuCom was sold to Variant Equity Advisors LLC for $305 million, with Kevin Shank named as president in December 2022.

References 

Office Depot
American companies established in 1987
1987 establishments in North Carolina
Companies based in South Carolina
Technology companies of the United States
2017 mergers and acquisitions